Blastoma is the second studio album by Papua New Guinea-born Australian-based singer Ngaiire, released on 10 June 2016. The album is named blastoma; a form of cancer Ngaiire battled at a young age. The album peaked at number 41 on the ARIA Charts.

Reception

Sosefina Fuamoli from The AU Review said "Ngaiire continues to explore a diverse musical palette on Blastoma, incorporating gritty electronics with some well produced hints of trip-hop and of course, that soul-soaked R&B vocal throughout. She shifts between the glossy and the raw with skill, allowing the listener to access this sonic environment she’s meticulously established before coming at us fast with evocative lyricism and music that hits right to your core."

Alex Watts from Beat Magazine commented on the spareness saying "with most tracks featuring Ngaiire’s voice prominent in the mix, and very simple electronic rhythmic and synth elements holding the tracks together."

Tom Williams from Music Feeds said the album "speaks of emotional pain, but also physical stress — bodies breaking, bodies tearing, skin being shed — all against backdrops of ice, hard rock, lost faith and graves being dug" adding "Blastoma shines when these themes and images are put up against harsh synths, belly-aching bass lines and rolling percussion."

Track listing

Charts

Release history

References

2016 albums
Ngaiire albums
Sony Music Australia albums